Komarov may refer to

People
Komarov (surname)

Places
Komárov (disambiguation), several villages in the Czech Republic and Slovakia
Komarov (volcano), a volcano on Kamchatka Peninsula, Russia
Komarov (crater), a crater on the Moon named after Soviet cosmonaut Vladimir Komarov
1836 Komarov, an asteroid named after the cosmonaut

Other
Komarov Botanical Institute, St. Petersburg, Russia, named after Vladimir Leontyevich Komarov
Kosmonaut Vladimir Komarov, a satellite tracking ship, named after Vladimir Komarov (1927–1967), Soviet cosmonaut

See also
Komarovo